Santa Eufemia del Barco is a municipality located in the province of Zamora, Castile and León, Spain. According to the 2004 census (INE), the municipality has a population of 279 inhabitants.

Town hall
Santa Eufemia del Barco is home to the town hall of 3 towns:
Losilla (90 inhabitants, INE 2020).
Santa Eufemia del Barco (77 inhabitants, INE 2020).
San Pedro de las Cuevas (8 inhabitants, INE 2020).

References

Municipalities of the Province of Zamora